A by-election was held for the Australian House of Representatives seat of Balaclava on 28 July 1951. This was triggered by the resignation of Liberal MP Thomas White, the Air and Civil Aviation Minister, to become Australian High Commissioner to the United Kingdom. A by-election for the seat of Macquarie was held on the same day.

The by-election was won by Liberal candidate Percy Joske.

Results

References

1951 elections in Australia
Victorian federal by-elections
1950s in Melbourne